Gilbert Hottois (29 March 1946 – 16 March 2019) was a Belgian professor of philosophy at the Université Libre de Bruxelles who specialised in Bioethics.

Hottois was born in Brussels. His positions included:
 Vice-Président of the Association des Sociétés de Philosophie de Langue Française (ASPLF) (2002–) ;
 Member of the Advisory Board of " Utopean studies " (St Louis, Miss., USA) ;
 President of the Société Belge de Philosophie (1990–1993) ;
 Founder member and vice-président (1990–) of the Société pour la philosophie de la technique (Paris) ; Président (1997–1999) ;
 Member of the Académie Royale des Sciences, des Lettres et des Beaux-Arts de Belgique (2003–) ;

He was chair of the programme committee of the 2008 World Congress of Philosophy

Publications
He published over 25 sole-authored books and numerous co-authored books and papers.

Single-authored books
 Hottois G., La science entre valeurs modernes et postmodernité, Paris, Vrin, 2005;
 Hottois G., Qu'est-ce que la bioéthique?, Paris, Vrin (Chemins philosophiques), 2004, 125 pages.
 Hottois G., Philosophies des sciences, philosophies des techniques, sous l'égide du Collège de France, Paris, Odile Jacob, 2004.
 Wetenschappelijke en bio-ethische praktijken (avec I. Stengers), Budel, Damon, 2003, 96 pages.
 Species Technica, Paris, Vrin, 2002, 348 pages - a science-fiction novel written in 1981
 Technoscience et Sagesse ?, Nantes, Ed. Pleins Feux, 2002, 58 pages.
 Essais de philosophie bioéthique et biopolitique, Vrin, 1999, 189 pages (trad. en japonais).
 La philosophie des technosciences, Presses des Universités de Côte d'Ivoire, Abidjan, 1997, 105 pages.
 De la Renaissance à la Postmodernité. Une histoire de la philosophie moderne et contemporaine, Bruxelles, De Boeck, 1997 (3è éd., 2001, 560 pages) (trad. en espagnol).
 Entre symboles et technosciences. Un itinéraire philosophique, Seyssel (Paris), Champ Vallon (PUF), 1996, 266 pages (trad. en néerlandais).
 G. Simondon et la philosophie de la "culture technique", Bruxelles, De Boeck, 1993, 140 pages.
 Le paradigme bioéthique (Une éthique pour la technoscience), Bruxelles-Montréal, De Boeck-Erpi, 1990, 216 pages (trad. en italien, espagnol et portugais).
 Penser la logique, Bruxelles, De Boeck, 1989, 273 pages (2è édit. 2002, 214 pages) (trad. en portugais).
 Du "sens commun" à la "société de communication". Etudes de philosophie du langage, Paris, Vrin, 1989, 222 pages.
 Le signe et la technique (La philosophie à l'épreuve de la technique) (préface de J. Ellul), Paris, Aubier, 1984, 220 pages (trad. en italien).
 Pour une éthique dans un univers technicien, Ed. de l'Université de Bruxelles, 1984, 106 pages.
 Pour une métaphilosophie du langage, Paris, Vrin, 1981, 170 pages.
 L'inflation du langage dans la philosophie contemporaine (préface de J. Ladrière), Editions de l'Université de Bruxelles, 1979, 390 pages.
 La philosophie du langage de L. Wittgenstein (préface de J. Bouveresse), Editions de l'Université de Bruxelles, 1976, 220 pages.

Notes and references

External links
Gilbert Hottois in Colombia

1946 births
2019 deaths
20th-century Belgian philosophers